The E3 International Agency Network is a well established and successful network of independent marketing communications agencies around the world, with a focus on business marketing. Founded in 1978, E3 now includes agencies in 17 countries across four continent, comprising over 1,200 professionals. E3 headquarters are located in Belgium.

History 
The network gets its name from the former European motorway Route E3 (part of the International E-road network), which connected Stockholm to Lisbon until the road numbers were reassigned in 1974. Similarly, the E3 network connects member agencies through collaboration and inroads to marketing innovation.

Governance 
A management committee of five to seven officers elected every two years meets monthly to make operational decisions for E3. The network holds an Annual General Meeting (AGM) and Extraordinary General Meeting (EGM) and Conference each year.

Activities 
E3 offers ongoing educational programs, information exchange through online and in-person meetings, and services to help members stay up-to-date on the latest marketing techniques and technologies from digital branding to social marketing. The network also provides an opportunity for intercultural exchange and job sharing. Members frequently collaborate in order to expand their range of services to clients. 

Membership is by invitation only and new agencies must be approved by a consensus vote of the management committee.

Member agencies
 BB&B / France
 BBC / Belgium
 BDB / UK
 Bernstein / Germany
 Brand Bar / Hungary
 Brandigo China / China
 Brandigo USA / USA
 BTL Africa / Ghana
 C&COM Advertising / Czech Republic
 Cordovan / Sweden
 EDesign / Saudi Arabia
 Happy / Denmark
 Huble Digital / UK
 Innovation Protocol / USA
 Lemm En Ten Haaf / Netherlands
 OZ Global B2B / Israel
 Preferendum / France
 SPS Marketing / Austria
 Schindler Parent / Germany
 The Marketing Practice / UK
 Valve / Finland
 Wisse Kommunikatie / Netherlands
 zuk / Germany
 ZurMarke / Switzerland

Mission 
E3’s goal is to make its members more successful by expanding their knowledge, extending their geographical reach and empowering them to take on new opportunities. These are the three E's of E3.

External links
 Official web site

References

Brand management
Marketing organizations
Advertising organizations